Antonio Bagnoli (25 February 1902 – 24 December 1997) was an Italian ordinary of the Catholic Church. He was the Bishop of Volterra and then the Bishop of Fiesole.

Biography 
Antonio Bagnoli was born on 25 February 1902 in Cortenuova, an Italian comune in the province of Bergamo, in the region of Lombardy. He entered the Catholic priesthood and was ordained a priest on 25 July 1925. On 17 August 1943, Bagnoli was appointed the Bishop of Volterra. He was subsequently consecrated a bishop on 7 October 1943 by Cardinal Elia Dalla Costa as principal consecrator and Bishops Ugo Giubbi and Francesco Niccoli as co-consecrators.

On 8 April 1954, Bagnoli was appointed the Bishop of Fiesole, during which time he participated as a council father in all four of sessions of the Second Vatican Council. He remained as Bishop of Fiesole until his retirement on 1 August 1977, upon which he took emeritus status. On 24 December 1997, Bagnoli died and is interned in the Fiesole Cathedral.

References

External links 
Diocese of Fiesole
Diocese of Volterra

20th-century Italian Roman Catholic bishops
1902 births
1997 deaths
Bishops in Tuscany
People from Fiesole
Clergy from the Province of Bergamo